The 1993–94  Liga Leumit season began on 28 August 1993 and ended on 4 June 1994, with Maccabi Haifa winning their fifth title.

That season saw one of the best teams in history of Israeli football, according to many pundits, when Maccabi Haifa won the league without suffering a single loss, breaking many Israeli records in the process.

In that season (as well as in the previous season) it was decided that three teams will be promoted from Liga Artzit and one relegated from Liga Leumit. The fourth place in Liga Artzit would play against before last (13th) place in Liga Leumit in a Playoff to see which team is to play in the premier league.

The three teams from Liga Artzit that were promoted at the end of the previous season: Maccabi Herzliya, Maccabi Ironi Ashdod and Hapoel Kfar Saba. The team relegated was Beitar Tel Aviv.

Final table

Results

First and second round

Third round

Promotion-relegation play-off
A promotion-relegation play-off between the 13th-placed team in Liga Leumit, Hapoel Haifa, and the 4th team in Liga Artzit, Shimshon Tel Aviv.

Hapoel Haifa won 3–1 on aggregate and remained in Liga Leumit.

Top scorers

References
Israel - List of Final Tables RSSSF

Liga Leumit seasons
Israel
1